A paper key is a machine-readable print of a cryptographic key. The printed key can be used to decrypt data, e.g. archives or backup data. A  paper key can be the result of an offline private key protocol. The offline private key can also function as a token in two-factor authentication.

The idea is that a digital key to decrypt and recover sensitive or personal data should have long-term durability and not be stored on any computer or network. The length of secure cryptographic keys restricts memorization, so the secret key takes the form of a 2D barcode, a machine-readable print. Early implementations of a paper key by the company Safeberg use a Data Matrix barcode. or human-readable base 16 digits.

The user stores the printed key in a secure location. To avoid abuse, the key can only be used in combination with a ‘normal’ password.

The user can extract the key by creating a digital photo or scan of their paper key and feeding it to cryptographic software that extracts the key to decrypt the data.

See also 
 Offline private key protocol

External links 

Key management
Data security